, there were about 4,900 electric vehicles (including plug-in hybrid vehicles) in Rhode Island, equivalent to 0.7% of all vehicles in the state.

Government policy
In March 2022, the state government introduced a $2,500 tax rebate for purchases of electric vehicles, and $1,500 for plug-in hybrid vehicles.

Charging stations
, there were about 210 public AC level 2 charging stations and 25 public DC charging stations in Rhode Island.

The Infrastructure Investment and Jobs Act, signed into law in November 2021, allocates  to charging stations in Rhode Island.

, the state government recognizes I-95 as a potential "alternative fuel corridor" with plans for charging stations every .

References

Rhode Island
Road transportation in Rhode Island